REPO is the fifth studio album by American experimental noise band Black Dice. It was released on April 7, 2009 on Paw Tracks Records.

Track listing 

"Night Creme" - 5:31
"Glazin" - 3:51
"Earnings Plus Interest" - 2:22
"Whirligig" - 0:21
"La Cucaracha" - 6:59
"Idiots Pasture" - 2:03
"Lazy TV" - 5:06
"Buddy" - 0:34
"Ten Inches" - 2:03
"Chicken Shit" - 4:01
"Vegetable" - 2:50
"Urban Supermist" - 1:22
"Ultra Vomit Craze" - 6:37
"Gag Shack" - 1:51

Black Dice albums
2009 albums